William J. Weinberg (born March 19, 1962) is an American political writer and radio personality based in New York City.  He writes journalism focusing on the struggles of indigenous peoples, largely in Latin America, but he has also written on the Middle East and local New York issues.  He is the co-editor of the on-line journal CounterVortex. The CounterVortex Family of Websites also includes Global Ganja Report. For twenty years he was the primary producer of a weekly late-night radio show on WBAI in New York, called The Moorish Orthodox Radio Crusade (founded in 1988 by Peter Lamborn Wilson, who is also known as Hakim Bey).  He has won three awards from the Native American Journalists Association. His basic political orientation is left-anarchist.

His work has appeared in publications such as The Nation, Al Jazeera, New America Media, Newsday,  The Village Voice, Middle East Policy,  In These Times, The Ecologist, Earth Island Journal, NACLA Report on the Americas and his own CounterVortex.

Bill Weinberg is a co-founder of National Organization for the Iraqi Freedom Struggles.

Publications

Books

Authored

Edited
Avant Gardening: Ecological Struggle in the City and the World. Autonomedia. 1999. (co-edited with Peter Lamborn Wilson).

Articles

Radio shows
Source:
The Struggle in Peru II 29 September 2009, Bill Weinberg with a travelogue and update on the indigenous struggle in Peru.
Critical Mass Under Attack V July 29, 2008, Bill Times Up on the latest escalation against Critical Mass.
The Tompkins Square Riot: 20 Years Later 22 July 2008, Chris Flash, editor of the Lower East Side underground paper The Shadow, and Frank Morales, co-editor of the anthology Police State America.
From Darfur to Mauritania 19 September 2006, Mamadou Barry and Abdarahmane Wone of the African Liberation Forces of Mauritania (FLAM) transcript
Anti-Zionism & Jewish Liberation Ella Goldman, Guy Izhak Austrian, Ora Wise and Nirit Ben-Ali of Jews Against the Occupation (JATO) February 4,11 2003

References

External links 
 Bill Weinberg's web page at MySpace
 CounterVortex (co-edited by Weinberg)

Living people
Writers from New York City
American anarchists
Libertarian socialists
American political writers
1962 births